A Confucian Confusion is a 1994 Taiwanese satirical comedy film directed by Edward Yang. It was entered into the 1994 Cannes Film Festival.

Cast
Chen Shiang-chyi as Qiqi
Yiwen Chen as Liren
Danny Dun as Larry
Hung Hung as Molly's brother-in-law
Elaine Jin as Auntie
Chen Limei as Molly's sister
Richie Li as Feng
Suk Kwan Ni as Molly
Bosen Wang as Akeem
Weiming Wang as Ming
Yeming Wang as Birdy

References

External links

1994 films
1994 comedy films
Taiwanese comedy films
Taiwanese-language films
Films directed by Edward Yang